Radončić is a surname found mostly in Montenegro and the Sandžak region of Serbia. In those areas, it is related with the Radončić brotherhood of Old Kuči. The village Radona with 55 households is attested in the nahiya of Kuči in the defter of the Sanjak of Scutari in 1485. Notable people with the surname include:

Dino Radončić (born 1999), Montenegrin professional basketball player
Dženan Radončić (born 1983), Montenegrin footballer
Fahrudin Radončić (born 1957), Bosnian businessman and politician

Bibliography 

Montenegrin surnames
Bosnian surnames